The 1994–95 season was the 47th season in Vardar’s history and their third in the Macedonian First League. Their 1st place finish in the 1993–94 season meant it was their 3rd successive season playing in the First League.

In that season Vardar was won the championship for the third consecutive time and their second Macedonian Cup, and qualified for the 1995–96 UEFA Cup.

Competitions

Overall

First League

Classification

Results by round

Matches

Sources: RSSSF.no, Google Groups

Macedonian Football Cup

Source: Google Groups

UEFA Cup

See also
List of unbeaten football club seasons

References

FK Vardar seasons
Vardar